Geographical Analysis is a quarterly peer-reviewed academic journal published by Wiley-Blackwell on behalf of the Department of Geography (Ohio State University). It was established in 1969 and the current editor-in-chief is Rachel S. Franklin. The journal covers geographical theory, model building, and quantitative methods.
These topics together are frequently referred to as geospatial analysis.

According to the Journal Citation Reports, the journal has a 2020 impact factor of 4.268.

References

External links 
 

Wiley-Blackwell academic journals
English-language journals
Publications established in 1969
Geography journals
Quarterly journals
Ohio State University